Jeremiah Reynolds (15 April 1867 – 1944) was a Scottish professional footballer who played as a full back.

References

External links 
Jerry Reynolds, www.ihibs.co.uk

1867 births
1944 deaths
Scottish footballers
Association football fullbacks
Celtic F.C. players
Hibernian F.C. players
Burnley F.C. players
Scottish Football League players
English Football League players
Footballers from Glasgow
Cowlairs F.C. players
People from Maryhill